= Kampung Kerupang =

Kampung Kerupang is a village in Federal Territory of Labuan, Malaysia.
